This is list of archives in Croatia.

Archives in Croatia 

 Croatian State Archives
 State Archives in Rijeka
 State Archives in Osijek

See also 

 List of archives
 List of museums in Croatia
 Culture of Croatia

External links 

 
Archives
Croatia
Archives